Yvonne Perry (born October 23, 1966, in Voorheesville, New York, U.S.) is an American actress. After years doing commercials, and nearly a year as part of the improv team tricking people for Candid Camera, her big break came in 1992 when she landed the role of Rosanna Cabot on the CBS soap opera As the World Turns. In 1993, she won the Soap Opera Digest award for Outstanding Female Newcomer which was the show's first win in that category. She and on-screen love interest Shawn Christian (ex-Mike) were voted Hottest Soap Opera Couple by People Magazine in 1995. In 1996, she left the program  but returned in 1998 and 1999.

After leaving As the World Turns, Yvonne studied in London with the Royal National Theatre, lived in LA for several years, and now resides in upstate NY with her husband, Mark, whom she married in 1993, and their two daughters.  She remains very good friends with former co-stars, Martha Byrne (Lily, ex-Rose) and Kelley Menighan Hensley (Emily). She has been a Visiting Guest Artist at Union College in Schenectady, New York and currently teaches at Siena College, Skidmore College, and the State University of New York at Albany.

Yvonne still enjoys an active career as a freelance actress.  She does regional theatre, commercials, voice-overs, books-on-tape, industrial films, and occasional independents.
In 2018 Yvonne became an Associate Artist at Capital Repertory Theatre in Albany, NY. - where she often performs, directs, and serves on the Next Act New Play Summit selection committee.  She also serves as the vice-chair of the Greater Albany Area Liaison for Actors Equity.

She played a divorced mother of a young boy in a half-hour comedy pilot called "Dads" in 1997.

Movie roles
In 2006, she appeared in the film "Ten 'til Noon" and in UnCivil Liberties. She appeared two unreleased films, "Winter of Frozen Dreams" and "Love Conquers Paul."

References

External links

 Official Website

1966 births
Living people
American stage actresses
American soap opera actresses
American film actresses
Siena College faculty
University at Albany, SUNY faculty
20th-century American actresses
People from Voorheesville, New York
Actresses from New York (state)
American women academics
21st-century American women